Baluan is a stratovolcano on Baluan Island in the Admiralty Islands. The volcano is considered dormant, though warm springs are present on the island and in 1931 there were unconfirmed reports of an active submarine vent nearby.

References 

Stratovolcanoes of Papua New Guinea
Pleistocene stratovolcanoes